Vincenzo Iacopino (born 9 August 1976) is an Italian former professional footballer who played as a midfielder. Most notably, he played four seasons in the Serie A for Sampdoria.

On 18 June 2012, Alberti was banned for three years and six month as a result of the 2011–12 Italian scandal.

References

External links
 

1976 births
Living people
Italian footballers
Serie A players
Serie B players
U.C. Sampdoria players
Hellas Verona F.C. players
Empoli F.C. players
Catania S.S.D. players
S.S.D. Lucchese 1905 players
U.C. AlbinoLeffe players
A.C. Monza players
S.S.D. Pro Sesto players
Association football midfielders